The Prohibition Party (PRO) is a political party in the United States known for its historic opposition to the sale or consumption of alcoholic beverages and as an integral part of the temperance movement. It is the oldest existing third party in the United States and the third-longest active party.

Although it was never one of the leading parties in the United States, it was once an important force in the Third Party System during the late 19th and early 20th centuries. The organization declined following the enactment of Prohibition in the United States but saw a rise in vote totals following the repeal of the Eighteenth Amendment in 1933. However, following World War II it declined, with 1948 being the last time its presidential candidate received over 100,000 votes and 1976 being the last time the party received over 10,000 votes.

The party's platform has changed over its existence. Its platforms throughout the 19th century supported progressive and populist positions including women's suffrage, equal racial and gender rights, bimetallism, equal pay, and an income tax. The platform of the party today is liberal on economic issues in that it supports Social Security, animal rights, and free education, but is conservative on social issues, such as supporting temperance, school prayer, and a consistent life ethic, thus making it communitarian.

History

Foundation

In 1868 and 1869, branches of the International Organisation of Good Templars, a global temperance organization, passed resolutions supporting the creation of a political party in favor of alcoholic prohibition. From July 29 to July 30, 1868, the sixth National Temperance Convention was held in Cleveland, Ohio, and passed a resolution supporting temperance advocates to enter politics. On May 25, 1869, the Good Templars branch in Oswego, New York, called a meeting to prepare for the creation of a political party in favor of prohibition. Jonathan H. Orne was chosen as chairman and Julius A. Spencer as secretary of the meeting and a committee consisting of John Russell, Daniel Wilkins, Julius A. Spencer, John N. Stearns, and James Black was created to organize a national party.

On September 1, 1869, almost five hundred delegates from twenty states and Washington, D.C., met at Farwell Hall in Chicago and John Russell was selected to serve as the temporary chairman and James Black as president of the convention. The party was the first to accept women as members and gave those who attended full delegate rights. Former anti-slavery activist Gerrit Smith, who had served in the House of Representatives from 1853 to 1854 and had run for president in 1848, 1856, and 1860 with the Liberty Party nomination, served as a delegate from New York and gave a speech at the convention. The organization was referred to as either the National Prohibition Party or the Prohibition Reform Party.

Early

On December 9, 1871, a national convention was called for February 22, 1872, to nominate a presidential and vice presidential candidate. Chairman Simeon B. Chase, U.S. Chief Justice Salmon P. Chase, Gerrit Smith, Mayor Neal Dow (a former mayor of Portland, Maine), and John Russell were proposed as presidential nominees while Henry Fish, James Black, John Blackman, Secretary Gideon T. Stewart, Julius A. Spencer, and Stephen B. Ransom were proposed for the vice presidential nomination. Black and Russell were given the presidential and vice presidential nominations. The first platform of the organization included support for alcoholic prohibition, the direct election of Senators, bimetallic currency (based on silver as well as gold), low tariffs, universal suffrage for both men and women of all races, and increased foreign immigration.

In 1876, the organization's name was changed to the National Prohibition Reform Party. However, in 1881, Frances Willard, R. W. Nelson, A. J. Jutkins, and George W. Bain formed the Home Protection Party, which was more pro-women's suffrage than the Prohibition Party, but later rejoined the party at the 1882 convention and the organization was renamed to the Prohibition Home Protection Party. However, at the 1884 national convention the organization was renamed to the National Prohibition Party.

Rise

In 1879, Frances Willard became the president of the Woman's Christian Temperance Union and although it had remained non-partisan in the 1876 and 1880 presidential elections, Willard advocated for a resolution under which the organization would pledge its support to whichever party would support alcoholic prohibition. Willard's attempts in 1882 and 1883 were unsuccessful, but she was successful in 1884 after her opponents left to join Judith Foster's rival Non-Partisan WCTU. During the 1884 presidential election the organization sent its resolution to the Republican, Democratic, Greenback, and Prohibition parties and only the Prohibition Party accepted. At the Woman's Christian Temperance Union's 1884 national convention in St. Louis the organization voted 195 to 48 in favor of supporting the Prohibition Party and would continue to support the Prohibition Party until Willard's death in 1898.

During 1884 election the party nominated John St. John, the former Republican governor of Kansas, who, with the support from Willard and the WTCU, saw the party poll 147,482 votes for 1.50% of the popular vote. However, the party was accused of spoiling the election due to Grover Cleveland's margin of victory over James G. Blaine in New York being less than John's vote total there. In 1888, the party's presidential nominee, Clinton B. Fisk, was accused of being a possible spoiler candidate that would prevent Benjamin Harrison from winning, but Harrison won the election even though he lost the national popular vote.

From January to February, 1892, Willard met with representatives from the Farmers' Alliance, People's Party, National Reform Party, and the remainder of the Greenback Party in Chicago and St. Louis in an attempt to create a fusion presidential ticket, but the organizations were unable to agree to a platform. The People's Party would later fuse with the Democratic Party in the 1896 presidential election.

The party suffered a schism at the 1896 Prohibition convention between the "narrow gauger" faction which supported having only an alcoholic prohibition plank in the party's platform and the "broad gauger" faction which supported the addition of free silver and women's suffrage planks. After the narrow gaugers successfully chose the presidential ticket and the party platform, the broad gaugers, led by former presidential nominee John St. John, Nebraska state chairman Charles Eugene Bentley, and suffragette Helen M. Gougar, walked out and create and created the breakaway National Party, nominating a rival ticket with Bentley as president and James H. Southgate as vice president. The Prohibition party ticket of Joshua Levering and Hale Johnson had the worst popular vote performance since Neal Dow's 10,364 votes in 1880, but still outperformed the National Party's 13,968 votes. Following the 1896 election most of the members of the National Party became disillusioned with that party and returned to the Prohibition Party, but those who remained reformed into the Union Reform Party and supported Seth H. Ellis and Samuel Nicholson during the 1900 presidential election., while the official Prohibition Party ticket of John G. Woolley and Henry B. Metcalf took 1.5% and third place in the national popular vote.

At the same time, the Prohibition Party's ideology broadened to include aspects of progressivism. The party contributed to the third-party discussions of the 1910s and sent Charles H. Randall to the 64th, 65th, and 66th Congresses (1915-21) as the representative of California's 9th congressional district; on April 6, 1917, Randall was one of 50 representatives who voted against U.S. entry into World War I. Democrat Sidney J. Catts of Florida, after losing a close Democratic primary, used the Prohibition line to win election as Governor of Florida in 1916; he remained a Democrat.

During the 1916 presidential election the party attempted to give its presidential nomination to former Democratic presidential candidate William Jennings Bryan, but he declined the offer via telegram. At the national convention the presidential nomination was given to former Indiana Governor Frank Hanly, but an attempt to make his nomination unanimous was defeated by Eugene W. Chafin, who had served as the presidential nominee in 1908 and 1912, and had supported giving the nomination to former New York Governor William Sulzer. Virgil G. Hinshaw wrote to John M. Parker in an attempt to fuse the Prohibition and Progressive parties, but it failed; the Progressives did not nominate a presidential candidate and later disbanded.

On February 4, 1918, the Prohibition affiliate in California voted in favor of merging with the National Party, which was created by pro-war defectors from the Socialist Party of America in 1917.

Decline

On January 16, 1919, the Eighteenth Amendment, which prohibited "intoxicating liquors" in the United States, was ratified by the requisite number of states. Although it was suggested that the organization should be disbanded due to national alcoholic prohibition being achieved, the committee leaders changed the focus of the organization to support the enforcement of prohibition. In 1921, the organization petitioned for any non-citizens who violated the Eighteenth Amendment to be deported and for citizen violators to lose their right to vote. At the 1924 national convention the party approved a platform with only two planks, namely, supporting religion in public schools and the assimilation of immigrants.

During the 1928 presidential election some members of the party, including Chairman D. Leigh Colvin and former presidential nominee Herman P. Faris, considered endorsing Republican Herbert Hoover rather than running a Prohibition candidate and risk allowing Al Smith, who supported ending prohibition, to be elected. However, the party chose to nominate William F. Varney due to its feeling that Hoover was not strict enough on prohibition, although the affiliate in California gave Hoover an additional ballot line and in Pennsylvania the affiliate did not file presidential electors. However, the party became critical of Hoover after he was elected president and during the 1932 presidential election D. Leigh Colvin stated that "The Republican wet plank, supporting the repeal of Prohibition, means that Mr. Hoover is the most conspicuous turncoat since Benedict Arnold." Hoover lost the election, but national prohibition was repealed in 1933, with the 21st Amendment during the Roosevelt administration.

Post World War II

In 1950, when the party was $5,000 in debt, Gerald Overholt was selected to be the party's chairman. During the 1952 presidential election, Overholt and Stuart Hamblen, the presidential nominee, spent $70,000 and the party's debt was increased to $20,000. During the 1954 elections, the affiliates in Pennsylvania, Massachusetts, Indiana, and Michigan lost their ballot access although the party remained successful in Kansas, where the Prohibition sheriff of Jewell County was reelected, and in California, where the attorney general nominee received over 200,000 votes.

In 1977, the party changed its name to the National Statesman Party, but Time magazine suggested that it was "doubtful" that the name change would "hoist the party out of the category of political oddity" and it changed its name back to the Prohibition Party in 1980.

The Prohibition Party experienced a schism in 2003, as the party's prior presidential candidate, Earl Dodge, incorporated a rival party called the National Prohibition Party in Colorado. An opposing faction nominated Gene C. Amondson for president and filed under the Prohibition banner in Louisiana. Dodge ran under the name of the historic Prohibition Party in Colorado, while the Concerns of People Party allowed Amondson to run on its line against Dodge. Amondson received 1,944 votes, nationwide, while Dodge garnered 140.

One key area of disagreement between the factions was over who should control payments from a trust fund dedicated to the Prohibition Party by George Pennock in 1930. The fund pays approximately $8,000 per year, and during the schism these funds were divided between the factions. Dodge died in 2007, allowing the dispute over the Pennock funds to finally be resolved in 2014. The party is reported as having only "three dozen fee-paying members".

In 2015, the party rejoined the board of the Coalition for Free and Open Elections and became a qualified political party in Mississippi. In the 2016 election, the party nominated James Hedges and qualified for the ballot in three states, Arkansas, Colorado, and Mississippi; he earned 5,514 votes becoming the most successful Prohibition presidential candidate since 1988.

The party met via telephone conference in November, 2018 to nominate its 2020 presidential ticket. Bill Bayes of Mississippi, the vice presidential nominee during the 2016 presidential election, was given the nomination on the first ballot over Adam Seaman and Phil Collins. C.L. Gammon of Tennessee was given the vice presidential nomination without opposition. Bayes resigned as the nominee, accusing some party activists of sabotaging his run because they opposed his views. Another telephone conference call was held, during which Gammon was given the presidential nomination and Collins was given the vice presidential nomination. However, Gammon withdrew from the nomination in August 2019 due to health problems, and another telephone conference was held that selected Collins for the presidential nomination and Billy Joe Parker for the vice presidential nomination.

Electoral history

Presidential campaigns
The Prohibition Party has nominated a candidate for president in every election since 1872 and is thus the longest-lived American political party after the Democrats and Republicans.

House

Notable members

 Joseph E. Anderson (1873−1937), Illinois state legislator and most recent Prohibition Party member of the Illinois General Assembly.
 Frances Estill Beauchamp (1860-1923), Kentucky state chair; secretary, national committee
 Marie C. Brehm, first legally qualified woman ever to be nominated for vice president
 Benjamin Bubar Jr., member of the Maine House of Representatives (1939–1944)
 Sidney Johnston Catts, 22nd Governor of Florida (1917–1921)
 Samuel Dickie, Chairman of the Prohibition Party (1887–1899) and the 9th Mayor of Albion, Michigan (1896–1897)
 Neal Dow, mayor of Portland, Maine (1851–1852; 1855–1856)
 Clay Freeman Gaumer, member of the Illinois House of Representatives from Vermilion County during the 35th General Assembly.
 Saxe J. Froshaug, member of the Minnesota Senate (1911-1915)
 John R. Golden, member of the Illinois House of Representatives from Ford County during the 45th General Assembly.
 Harvey W. Hardy, mayor of Lincoln, Nebraska (1877–1879)
 Frank Hanly, 26th Governor of Indiana (1905–1909)
 James Hedges, Tax Assessor for Thompson Township, Pennsylvania (2002–2007) and first elected Prohibitionist in the 21st century.
 Nicholas L. Johnson, member of the Illinois House of Representatives from Kane County during the 46th General Assembly.
 James Lamont, member of the Illinois House of Representatives from Winnebago County during the 35th General Assembly.
 John St. John, 8th Governor of Kansas (1879–1883)
 Charles Hiram Randall, member of the California State Assembly (1911–1912) and Representative from California's 9th congressional district (1915–1921)
 Frank S. Regan (1862–1944), member of the Illinois House of Representatives from Winnebago County during the 41st General Assembly.
 Susanna M. Salter, first female mayor in the United States (1887–1888)
 Daniel R. Sheen (1852–1926), member of the Illinois House of Representatives from Peoria County during the 44th General Assembly.
 Green Clay Smith, Representative from Kentucky's 6th congressional district (1863–1866) and 2nd Territorial Governor of Montana (1866–1869)
 Emily Pitts Stevens, joined the Prohibition Party in 1882, and led the movement, in 1888, to induce the Woman's Christian Temperance Union to endorse that party.
 Oliver W. Stewart, Chairman of the Prohibition Party (1900–1905) and member of the Illinois House of Representatives (1903–1905)
 Frances Willard, one of the founders of the Woman's Christian Temperance Union
 Alonzo Wilson (1868–1949), member of the Illinois House of Representatives from DuPage County during the 44th General Assembly.
 Josephus C. Vines, mayor of Brighton, Alabama

Platform
The Prohibition Party platform, as listed on the party's web site in 2018, includes the following points:

Social issues
 Blue laws prohibiting employers in all fields except public safety from requiring employees to work on the Sabbath
 Support for voluntary prayer in public schools
 Opposition to attempts to remove religion from the public square
 Consistent life ethic
 Anti-abortion
 Opposition to capital punishment
 Opposition to physician-assisted suicide
 A Constitutional amendment to ban the government from issuing marriages, which shall be replaced by civil unions between any two adults
 Opposition to pornography
 Recognition of the contributions of immigrants to the United States
 Prohibition on gambling and abolition of all state lotteries
 Prohibition of all non-medicinal drugs, including alcohol and tobacco
 Campaigns to promote temperance
 A "strict interpretation" of the Second Amendment to the United States Constitution that includes a right to use arms for defense and sport
 Opposition to testing on animals
 Prohibition on use of animals in sport

Economic issues
 Abolition of the United States Federal Reserve and re-establishment of the Bank of the United States
 Strict laws against usury
 Right to work
 A fully funded Social Security system
 A Balanced Budget Amendment
 Increased spending on public works projects
 Opposition of government financial interference in, or aid to, commerce
 Free college education for all Americans
 Job training programs paid for by tariffs

Foreign policy issues
 A non-interventionist foreign policy
 Eliminating conscription in times of peace
 Opposition to military action that violates Just War principles
 Fair trade
 Use of human rights considerations in determining most favored nation status
 A generous policy of asylum for people facing persecution or living in inhumane conditions

Chairmen
In 1867, John Russell became the first chairman of the Prohibition party, with Earl Dodge serving the longest for twenty four years and Gregory Seltzer serving the shortest for one year.

 1867–1872: John Russell
 1872–1876: Simeon B. Chase
 1876–1880: James Black
 1880–1884: Gideon T. Stewart
 1884–1887: John B. Finch
 1887–1899: Samuel Dickie
 1900–1905: Oliver W. Stewart
 1905–1908: Charles R. Jones
 1908–1924: Virgil G. Hinshaw
 1924–1925: B. E. P. Prugh
 1925–1932: D. Leigh Colvin
 1932–1947: Edward E. Blake
 1947–1950: Virgil C. Finnell
 1950–1953: Gerald Overholt
 1953–1955: Lowell H. Coate
 1955–1971: E. Harold Munn
 1971–1979: Charles Wesley Ewing
 1979–2003: Earl Dodge
 2003–2005: Don Webb
 2005–2009: Gene Amondson
 2009–2013: Toby Davis
 2013–2014: Gregory Seltzer
 2014–2019: Rick Knox
 2019–2020: Randy McNutt
 2020–present: Phil Collins

See also

 Alcohol during and after prohibition
 Law Preservation Party (New York branch of the Prohibition Party)
 List of political parties in the United States
 Scottish Prohibition Party
 Robert P. Shuler
 Social conservatism
 Temperance organizations

References

Citations

Primary sources

Further reading
 Andersen, Lisa, "From Unpopular to Excluded: Prohibitionists and the Ascendancy of a Democratic-Republican System, 1888–1912", Journal of Policy History, 24 (no. 2, 2012), pp. 288–318.
 Cherrington, Ernest Hurst, ed. Standard encyclopedia of the alcohol problem (5 vol. 1930).
 Colvin, David Leigh. Prohibition in the United States: a History of the Prohibition Party, and of the Prohibition Movement (1926)
 McGirr, Lisa. The War on Alcohol: Prohibition and the Rise of the American State (2015)
 Pegram, Thomas R. Battling demon rum: The struggle for a dry America, 1800–1933 (1998)

External links
 
 Prohibition Partisan Historical Society (Official Website)
 Prohibition Party on Facebook
 
 Partisan prophets; a history of the Prohibition Party, 1854–1972, Roger C. Storms

 
1869 establishments in the United States
Christian democratic parties in the United States
Conservative parties in the United States
Political parties established in 1869
Prohibition
Prohibition in the United States
Prohibition parties
Single-issue political parties
Social conservative parties
Temperance organizations in the United States